Volhynian-Podolian Upland is a system of uplands in West Ukraine and Right-bank Ukraine.

The upland includes such features:
 Podillia Upland
Opillia Upland
Lviv Plateau
Holohory-Kremenets Ridge
Kremenets Hills
Holohory (Barren Hills)
Voroniaky
Tovtry
Medobory
Pruth-Dniester Tovtry
Murafa Tovtry
 Volhynia-Kholm Upland
Kholm Upland
Sokal Ridge
Bug Upland
Horokhiv Upland
Povcha Upland
Rivne Plateau
Hoshcha Plateau
Mizoch Ridge
Shepetivka Plain
 Little Polesia
 Bug Depression
Ridged Bug Plain
 Brody Plain
 Ostroh Valley

Along with Roztochia Upland and Moldavian Plateau, the upland forms the Volhynian-Podolian Plate.

External links
 Volhynian-Podolian Upland at Encyclopedia of Ukraine.
Part II. Encyclopedia of Ukrainian Studies. Paris, New-York, 1955 

 
Plateaus of Ukraine
Plateaus of Poland
East European Plain